Hurry Up and Wait may refer to:

 Hurry up and wait, an English-language expression
 Hurry Up and Wait (Joe Lynn Turner album), 1998
 Hurry Up and Wait (Riddlin' Kids album), 2002
 Hurry Up and Wait (Dune Rats album), 2020
 "Hurry Up and Wait" (song), a 1999 song by Stereophonics
 Hurry Up and Wait (Soul Asylum album), 2020
 "Hurry Up and Wait", a 2004 song by Pitbull from M.I.A.M.I.